The Minister of State for Competitiveness was an office held by a member of  the United Kingdom government and appointed by the Prime Minister of the United Kingdom.

The position was created within the Department of Trade and Industry following Tony Blair's victory in the 1997 general election and was initially held by Ian McCartney. The office was vacant between 1999 and 2001.

Following Gordon Brown's election as Labour leader and Prime Minister in July 2007, the Department for Business, Enterprise and Regulatory Reform was created and the position was re-established and held again by Timms until January 2008. He was succeeded by Baroness Vadera, who served in the more junior role of Parliamentary Under-Secretary of State with additional responsibilities for small business, deregulation, the British Business Council and the Cabinet Office. She left the post in June 2009, when the Department for Business, Enterprise and Regulatory Reform was merged with the Department for Innovation, Universities and Skills.

Ministers of State for Competitiveness 1997–2010

References

Competitiveness
Defunct ministerial offices in the United Kingdom